= Clubhouse Baseball =

1989 board game

Clubhouse Baseball is a board game published in 1989 by Clubhouse Games Inc.

== Contents ==
Clubhouse Baseball is a game in which 624 individual player cards are included, covering the 1988 season.

== Reception ==
Mike Siggins reviewed Clubhouse Baseball for Games International magazine, and gave it a rating of 7 out of 10, and stated that "If Clubhouse Baseball falls a little short of the optimum replay game, where does it succeed? My view is that it will work as an ideal starter game for the beginning who will get plenty of use from it before perhaps choosing to move onto other, more complex, games."
